This is a list of places of interest in the British county of Suffolk. See List of places in Suffolk for a list of settlements in Suffolk.

Babergh

Forest Heath

Ipswich

Mid Suffolk

St Edmundsbury

Suffolk Coastal

Waveney 

Suffolk